Ian Noel Hughes  (born 5 December 1951) is a British diplomat who has served as ambassador to Guatemala, El Salvador, Liberia and South Sudan, and high commissioner to Sierra Leone.

Biography
Hughes was educated at Khormaksar (then within the United Kingdom's Colony of Aden) and St John's School, Singapore. He joined the Foreign and Commonwealth Office in 1971 and served in Kabul, Warsaw, Tegucigalpa, Berne and New Delhi, and as deputy head of mission in Mexico City and Mumbai, before being appointed ambassador to Guatemala (and non-resident ambassador to El Salvador and Honduras) in 2006. He was High Commissioner to Sierra Leone (and non-resident ambassador to Liberia) 2009–13. In March 2013 he became ambassador to South Sudan. He was replaced in May 2015.

He was appointed Companion of the Order of St Michael and St George (CMG) in the 2014 Birthday Honours for services to British interests in South Sudan and Sierra Leone.

Offices held

References
HUGHES, Ian Noel, Who's Who 2013, A & C Black, 2013; online edn, Oxford University Press, Dec 2012, accessed 5 April 2013

1951 births
Living people
Ambassadors of the United Kingdom to Guatemala
Ambassadors of the United Kingdom to El Salvador
Ambassadors of the United Kingdom to Honduras
High Commissioners of the United Kingdom to Sierra Leone
Ambassadors of the United Kingdom to Liberia
Ambassadors of the United Kingdom to South Sudan
Companions of the Order of St Michael and St George